Dale Carr (born August 4, 1954) is an American politician. He is a Republican who represents the 12th district in the Tennessee House of Representatives. Previously, he was an alderman in Sevierville, TN.

Political career

Carr was an alderman in Sevierville, TN from 2008 to 2012.

In 2012, he challenged incumbent Richard Montgomery in the Republican primary election to represent the 12th district in Tennessee's House of Representatives. He narrowly won the primary, with 50.6% of the vote, and was unopposed in the general election. He is now serving his fourth term in that seat, and is running for election to a fifth term in 2020.

Carr currently sits on the following House committees:
 Property & Planning Subcommittee (Chair)
 Transportation Committee
 Safety & Funding Subcommittee
 Naming, Designating, & Private Acts Committee
 Local Committee

On June 9, 2020, Carr voted as a member of the House Naming, Designating, & Private Acts Committee against removal of a bust honoring Ku Klux Klan Grand Wizard Nathan Bedford Forrest from the Tennessee State Capitol building

Electoral record

2012

Carr was unopposed in the general election in 2012.

2014

In 2014, Carr was unopposed in both the Republican primaries and the general elections.

2016

In 2016, Carr was again unopposed in both the Republican primaries and the general elections.

2018

In 2018, Carr was unopposed in the Republican primary.

References

Republican Party members of the Tennessee House of Representatives
1954 births
Living people
21st-century American politicians